The Llallawa Jawira (Aymara llallawa a monstrous potato (like two potatoes) or animal, jawira river, also spelled Llallagua Jahuira) which upstream successively is named Patu Uma, Ch'alla Jawira, Jach'a Qura, Lupipi and Chuqi Phuju is a river in the La Paz  Department in Bolivia. It is a left tributary of the Desaguadero River.

Course 
It flows towards the village of Inka Uyu in the southeast. While it surrounds the plains named T'ula Chita Pampa, T'utur Juqhu Pampa and T'ulan Chata Pampa it receives the names Ch'alla Jawira ("sand river") and Jach'a Qura ("big herb" (river)). East of Lupipi it gets that name. It flows to the west. East of Wankarani it turns to the south and then west again near the village of Chuqi Phuju ("gold spring", Choque Phuju, Choque Puju, Choquepujo) where the river is called after the village. From now on its direction is mainly to the southwest. Before it reaches the village of Llallawa it receives the name Llallawa Jawira.

Tributaries 
Some of the left affluents of the Llallawa Jawira are Jallawani Uma, Yawri Qalani, Taypi Churu, Ch'iyar Jawira, Uma Jalsuri and  Qala Sayani. Pajcha Pata and Ch'illiwa are right tributaries.

References

Rivers of La Paz Department (Bolivia)